The Valeriano Fault System is a group of related geological faults located in the high Andes of southern Atacama Region, Chile. The Inca road system follows the fault from north to south.

See also
Incas in Central Chile

References

Geology of Atacama Region
Seismic faults of Chile